Marius Urukov (born 24 June 1967) is a former Bulgarian footballer who played as a defender.

Career
Urukov spent his entire professional career in Bulgaria, mainly playing in the top division of Bulgarian football. He had two spells with powerhouse CSKA Sofia, but his football path is most frequently associated with Slavia Sofia, where he is considered to be among the top players in the club's history.

References

1967 births
Living people
Bulgarian footballers
Bulgaria youth international footballers
Bulgaria international footballers
PFC Spartak Pleven players
PFC CSKA Sofia players
FC Lokomotiv 1929 Sofia players
PFC Slavia Sofia players
FC Septemvri Sofia players
First Professional Football League (Bulgaria) players
People from Pleven Province
Association football defenders